Sri Lankan state-sponsored colonization schemes is the government program of settling mostly farmers from the densely populated wet zone in the sparsely populated areas of the dry zone near tanks and reservoirs being built in major irrigation and hydro-power programs such as the Mahaweli project. This has taken place since the 1950s.

Sinhala Buddhist nationalists within the Sri Lankan government, Buddhist clergy and Mahaweli department have deliberately targeted the Tamil majority northeast for state sponsored Sinhala colonisation, with the explicit intention to take the land into "Sinhala hands" away from the Tamils. Tamils saw this as another attempt of the Sinhalese-dominated state to marginalize them further by decreasing their numbers in the area. Sinhalese settlers were provided with preferential access to land by the state in these regions, whilst the local Tamil speaking people were excluded from this privilege. It has been perhaps the most immediate cause of inter-communal violence.

Introduction
Shortly after independence, the government of Ceylon started a program to settle farmers in the jungles of the Trincomalee District. The forests were cleared and water tanks restored. As a consequence of these schemes the Sinhalese population of the Trincomalee District rose from 15,706 (21%) in 1946 to 85,503 (33%) in 1981. In the 1980s the government extended the colonization schemes into the Dry Zone area of the Northern Province, drawing up plans to settle up to 30,000 Sinhalese in the area. Colonization schemes also took place in the areas of Ampara and Batticaloa districts. The Sinhalese population rose from 31,107 in 1953 in the combined Batticaloa and Amparai Districts to 157,017 in 1981, an increase far in excess of the natural projected growth.

The notion of the "traditional Tamil homeland" became a potent component of popular Tamil political imagination while the Sinhalese nationalist groups viewed the resettlement schemes in these areas as "reclamation and recreation in the present of the glorious Sinhalese Buddhist past". The Muslim community tended to reject the countervailing notion of a traditional Tamil homeland in the North East region which resulted in animosity between the Muslim and Tamil communities in the region to rise.

1950s
The first colonisation scheme was in the Gal Oya Valley in the Batticaloa District in 1952. Tens of thousands of Sinhalese peasants from the Kegalle and Kandy districts who suffered from land hunger were given fertile land in the upstream end of Gal Oya. Tamils and Muslims were also given land in the region. Gal Oya would later be the site of the first major anti-Tamil riot in 1956.
 
The next colonisation scheme was at Kantale (Kanthalai) tank where peasants from outside of the Trincomalee District were settled in the then Tamil dominant village of Kantale (Kanthalai), 39 km south-west of the Trincomalee town. 77% of settlers were Sinhalese and the rest were Tamils and Muslims.

A colonisation scheme was at the areas surrounding the Kantale Tank, 25 km south of Trincomalee town. 65% of settlers were Sinhalese and the rest were Muslims.

The colonisation scheme was extended to Tamil speaking areas of Anuradhapura District. A scheme was started at Padaviya Tank (Pathavik Kulam), 65 km north-east of Anuradhapura town. Parts of the scheme lay in Trincomalee District but were administered by the Sinhalese majority Anuradhapura District. Land Development Department employees from this scheme took part in the 1958 anti-Tamil riots.

Colonisation of Southern Dry Zone in the south of Ceylon was carried out mainly under the Walawe River Valley which was planned in 1959. The Uda Walawe Project started in 1969 which resulted in 30,000 net irrigable acres and settlement of around 3440 settlers in the southern dry zone. The development of settlements around Walawe, Chandrika and Kiri Ibban reservoirs saw population in the selected region growing from 2,000 in the 1950s to 200,000 by the 2000s.

1960s
In the 1961 a colonisation scheme was started at Morawewa tank (Muthali Kulam), 24 km west of the Trincomalee town.

1980s
In the 1980s, funded by aid received from the European Community, a colonisation scheme was started at Periya Vilankulam (Mahadiulwewa) tank, 30 km north-west of Trincomalee town.

The colonisation scheme was extended into the Northern province with the introduction of the Weli Oya (Manal Aru) scheme, which covered the districts of Mullaitivu, Trincomalee, Vavuniya and Anuradhapura. Sinhalese farmers were settled in lands that were formerly populated by ethnic Tamils, given land, money to build homes and security provided by the Special Task Force. Although the scheme covered four districts, administration was handled by the Anuradhapura district, which constituted a Sinhalese majority demographic. The scheme aroused much anger amongst the Tamils. This anger boiled over into violence when the Liberation Tigers of Tamil Eelam attacked the Kent and Dollar Farm settlement at Weli Oya, killing 62.

1990s
Pro-LTTE news site TamilNet reported that when the Indian Peace Keeping Forces were withdrawn in 1990, Tamils homes in the suburbs of Trincomalee were occupied by Sinhalese settlers. Tens of thousands of landless Sinhala peasants were reported to have been brought in by the advancing government forces and made to occupy local villages and lands, denying resettlement to its original inhabitants who had earlier fled to the jungles due to the "murder" of Tamil civilians at the hands of the Army.

2000s 

Since the fall of the LTTE and the capture of LTTE held areas, several settlement programmes were initiated by the government that extends towards the Northern Province. In the Vavuniya district 3000 acres in Madukulam (Maduwewa) are being cleared for a village, while work of a settlement is underway in the former LTTE stronghold of Othiyamalai Kaadu. A settlement is being created in Rampaveddi bordering the minor tank area of Eropothana and new settlement of approximately 2500 ethnic Sinhala families (about 6000 people) from the South were settled in the village of Kokkachaankulam. Tamils in Barathypuram were evicted and a Muslim settlement is being created in the area due to the large economic opportunities provided by an apparels factory being built there.

Several new settlements are also being built in Mullaitivu District while the Weli Oya settlement is being expanded as well. Several fishing colonies are being built in the Mannar district and Muslim settlements have been built in lands previously owned by Tamils that fled to India during the war.
‘Navatkuli Housing Project’ is being built in Navatkuli, Jaffna District to house 135 Sinhalese families, including 54 families who had, in 2010, attempted to set up temporary residences at the Jaffna Railway Station with funding from Buddhist Organizations and Political parties.

Pro-LTTE news site TamilNet reported that Tamils were being ethnically cleansed in the Jaffna peninsula and Mullativu districts, and that this was being supplemented with the construction of Buddhist stupas and Sinhalisation of names of streets and places. According to TamilNet the Tamil populace had been reduced to a fourth between 2007 and 2011 based on Government figures. Tamil locals also complained of the state waging an accelerated campaign of Sinhala Buddhist colonisation by destroying historic Hindu shrines in the East. Over 400 families were reported to have been settled in Nelukkulam in Mullativu district by the website. Another incident of state colonization before the Final Eelam War was reported by Muslim residents of the Pulmoddai village who claimed that several acres of their traditional land had been annexed by the Government for settlements from South on the pretext of industrial development.

See also
Origins of the Sri Lankan civil war
Sri Lankan Civil War
Black July

References

Further reading

Geography of Sri Lanka
Political repression
Politics of Sri Lanka
Sri Lankan Tamil history
Settlement schemes in Asia
Origins of the Sri Lankan Civil War
Internal migration
Politically motivated migrations
Sinhalese nationalism